The 2011 F.C. Tokyo season was F.C. Tokyo's first season in J. League Division 2 since 1999. F.C. Tokyo won promotion back into the 2012 J. League Division 1, F.C. Tokyo also won the 2011 Emperor's Cup.

Players

Current squad
As of July 17, 2010

Out on loan

2011 season transfers
In

Out

Competitions

J. League

League table

Results summary

Results by round

Emperor's Cup

External links
J. League - 2011 J. League Schedule

FC Tokyo
2011